Paraphasiopsis is a genus of parasitic flies in the family Tachinidae. There are at least two described species in Paraphasiopsis.

Species
These two species belong to the genus Paraphasiopsis:
 Paraphasiopsis mellicornis Townsend, 1917
 Paraphasiopsis trinitatis Thompson, 1963

References

Further reading

 
 
 
 

Tachinidae
Articles created by Qbugbot